Bartosz Źrebiec (born 7 January 1978 in Poland in Wrocław), also known as Barth La Picard, is a Polish guitarist and vocalist who is the frontman for the heavy metal band Grimlord.

Discography

 Nocna Wizyta (CD Demo, 2003)
 Zaćmienie (CD single, 2005)
 Blood Runneth Over (2007)
 Dolce Vita Sath An As (2009)
 V-Column (Legacy Records, 2012)

Filmography
 Rutterkin – Defender of the Scythe (2012), fantasy movie, created by Bartosz Źrebiec

Other projects
 Vallachia – The dawn of the new empire (Gitara) 
 Zvantevith – Pogańskie dusze Ryczyna 1995 (Warhagan Rec. Instrumenty klawiszowe) 
 Eternal Fear – Eternal Fear 1995 (Warhagan Rec. Instrumenty klawiszowe)

See also
 Barth La Picard na Facebook
 Barth La Picard na Myspace
 Oficjalna strona zespolu Grimlord

References

1978 births
Polish heavy metal guitarists
Living people
Polish heavy metal singers
English-language singers from Poland
20th-century Polish male  singers
21st-century Polish male singers
21st-century Polish singers
21st-century guitarists
Polish male guitarists